Kunduz is a city in northern Afghanistan, the capital of Kunduz Province. The city has an estimated population of about 268,893 as of 2015, making it about the 7th-largest city of Afghanistan, and the largest city in northeastern Afghanistan. Kunduz is in the historical Tokharistan region of Bactria, near the confluence of the Kunduz River with the Khanabad River. Kunduz is linked by highways with Kabul to the south, Mazar-i-Sharif to the west, and Badakhshan to the east. Kunduz is also linked with Dushanbe in Tajikistan to the north, via the Afghan dry port of Sherkhan Bandar. This city is famous in Afghanistan for its watermelon.

As of 2015, the land use of the city (within the municipal boundary) is largely agricultural (65.8% of total area). Residential land comprises nearly half of the 'built-up' land area (48.3%) with 29,877 dwellings. Institutional land comprises 17.9% of built-up land use, given that the airport is within the municipal boundary.

Etymology 
Kunduz is also sometimes spelled (romanized) as Kundûz, Qonduz, Qondûz, Konduz, Kondûz, Kondoz, or Qhunduz. The name of the city is derived from the Persian compound, kohan dež, "old/ancient fort".

History 

Kunduz is the site of the ancient city of Drapsaka. It was a great centre of Buddhist learning and very prosperous during the 3rd century AD.

The name Kuhandiz began to be used from the Timurid time.

In the 18th and 19th centuries it was the capital of an Uzbek khanate which reached its largest extent, from Balkh to the Pamir Mountains, during the reign of Murad Beg (1815–1842). After Murad's death, the khanate declined and was eventually subjugated by Afghanistan in 1859. It was part of The Great Game between the British and Russians.

In the early 20th century, between one-hundred and two-hundred thousand Tajiks and Uzbeks fled the conquest of their homeland by Russian Red Army and settled in northern Afghanistan.

In the early 20th century, under the governance of Sher Khan Nasher, Kunduz became one of the wealthiest Afghan provinces. This was mainly due to Nasher's founding of the Spinzar Cotton Company, which continues to exist in post-war Afghanistan. At its peak, the Spinzar Cotton Company employed 5,000 people full time. Kunduz is the most important agricultural province which produces wheat, rice, millet, and other products and obtained the nickname of "the hive of the country."

21st century
Kunduz is the centre for the northeast provinces and was captured by the Taliban in 1997. It was the last major city held by the Taliban before its fall to US-backed Afghan Northern Alliance forces on 26 November 2001.During the summer of 2015, the Taliban advanced and attacked the city, which resulted in a battle for control of the city against Afghan forces. Tens of thousands of inhabitants were displaced internally by the fighting. On 28 September 2015 the Taliban flag was again raised in the city center and the Taliban managed to capture the city prison and free many prisoners. The Afghan Armed Forces counter-attacked and managed to re-capture the city in 15 days. The Taliban announced that, after achieving their objectives, they have withdrawn from the city's center. Zabiullah Mujahid, a Taliban spokesperson, said that their main object in leaving the city is to avoid civilian casualties from air raids. In April 2018 the Afghan Air Force conducted an airstrike that killed and injured dozens of civilians at a religious school in Kunduz. On 31 August 2019, the Taliban forces launched another attack on the city, setting off a major battle with local security forces.

On 19 May 2020, the Taliban killed one policeman and one civilian and injured 18 others in a motorbike bomb blast in Kunduz. On the same day, the Taliban attempted again to capture Kunduz, attacking several government posts but were repelled by the Afghan security forces. The Taliban were forced to flee the city, leaving ten dead bodies behind. Eight Afghan soldiers and three civilians were killed and 55 others were wounded during the Taliban attack.

On 8 August 2021, the Taliban as part of their nationwide military offensive captured Kunduz, along with Sar-e-Pul and Taloqan after heavy clashes with ANA forces.

On 8 October 2021, a militant of ISKP detonated a suicide vest targeting shia worshippers at the Gozar-e-Sayed Abad Mosque, killing 50+ people and wounding over 100.

Geography 
Kunduz is strategically situated on the main north–south highway linking Kabul to Tajikistan, and east–west Mazar-i-Sharif to Taloqan and Fayzabad.

Climate 
Kunduz has a cold semi-arid climate (Köppen climate classification BSk) with hot summers and cool winters. Precipitation is generally low except from January to April, with summers almost always rainless.

Demographics 

The city of Kunduz has an estimated population of about 268,893 as of 2015. Ethnic Pashtuns comprise the largest segment, followed by Uzbeks, Tajiks, Arabs and a few others. Kunduz is the capital of a highly diverse province that includes significant populations of Pashtuns, Tajiks, Uzbeks, Hazaras, Arabs, Balochis and Turkmens.

Kunduz Arabs speak Persian and Pashto, Afghanistan's two official languages, rather than Arabic. However, they claim a strong Arab identity, based on their tribal origins in Arabia. This may in fact point to the seventh-century and eighth-century migration to this and other Central Asian locales of many Arab tribes from Arabia in the wake of the Islamic conquests of the region.

Administration 

Kunduz city is divided into 8 Districts ('Nahias') with a total land area of 11,206 hectares.

The most influential leader of Kunduz was Arif Khan, who was a governor of Kunduz Province and was shot dead in the city of Peshawar, Pakistan in the year 2000. Soon after the incident his brother Haji Omar Khan took his responsibility and was appointed as the Governor of Kunduz (2000–01).

Sports 
Professional sports teams from Kunduz

Stadiums
 Kunduz Cricket Ground
 Kunduz Ground

Notable people 
Sher Khan Nasher, chief clan of (Ghilji) Kharoti Nasher tribe
Gholam Nabi Nasher Khan (1926–2010), parliamentarian
Sayed Noorullah Murad (Afghan politician, member of federal cabinet, military commander and scholar) Imam Saheb district
Gulbudin Hekmatyar, Afghan political leader, Afghan politician, former mujahideen and drug trafficker
Javed Ahmadi (1992–), player of the Afghanistan national cricket team
Abdul Rauf Ibrahimi, former Afghan National Parliament Speaker
Farhad Darya, Afghan singer

See also 
List of cities in Afghanistan
Farhad Darya
2009 Kunduz airstrike
2015 Kunduz hospital airstrike
Kunduz Trauma Centre
Kunduz Airport
Kunduz University
Battle of Kunduz (2015)
Battle of Kunduz (2016)

References

Further reading
Dupree, Nancy Hatch (1977): An Historical Guide to Afghanistan. 1st Edition: 1970. 2nd Edition. Revised and Enlarged. Afghan Tourist Organization.
Thomas J. Barfield, The Central Asian Arabs of Afghanistan: Pastoral Nomadism in Transition. 1982.

External links

Kunduz Province by Naval Postgraduate School
Welcome to Kunduz, Allauddin

Populated places in Kunduz Province
Cities in Afghanistan
Cities in Central Asia
Kunduz Province
Populated places along the Silk Road
Provincial capitals in Afghanistan
Populated places with period of establishment missing